John Bear Doane Cogswell (June 6, 1829June 11, 1889) was an American lawyer and Republican politician from the U.S. state of Massachusetts.  He was President of the Massachusetts Senate for the 1877, 1878, and 1879 sessions, and was United States Attorney for the District of Wisconsin during the presidency of Abraham Lincoln.  He was the last U.S. Attorney for Wisconsin before its division into Western and Eastern districts.

Biography

In 1847, while at Dartmouth College he became a member of Zeta Chapter of Psi Upsilon Fraternity. In 1852, he was awarded the LL B. from Harvard Law School.

See also
 1872 Massachusetts legislature
 1873 Massachusetts legislature
 1877 Massachusetts legislature
 1878 Massachusetts legislature
 1879 Massachusetts legislature

References
 Jameson, E. O.,: The Cogswell in America, (Boston: Alfred Mudge & Son, 1884), p. 358;
 Dartmouth College ... 1769-1940 (Hanover, N.H., 1940), p. 162.
 Nutt, Charles: A History of Worcester and Its People, (New York City: Lewis Historical Publishing Company, 1919), vol. III, p. 206-207.

Notes

External links
Biography of Cogswell at the American Antiquarian Society Manuscript Collection
Massachusetts State Representatives George Washington Clark, John Bear Doane Cogswell, Robert Couch, Benjamin Franklin Hayes, Barney Hull, Liberty Dodge Packard, Henry Splaine, Francis Dana Stedman, Eliphalet Loring Thayer, Hugh James Toland, Tisdale Sanford White, Ezra Dyer Winslow.

Massachusetts lawyers
Massachusetts state senators
Presidents of the Massachusetts Senate
Members of the Massachusetts House of Representatives
United States Attorneys for the District of Wisconsin
Politicians from Worcester, Massachusetts
Lawyers from Milwaukee
People from Yarmouth, Massachusetts
Dartmouth College alumni
Harvard Law School alumni
1829 births
1889 deaths
19th-century American politicians
19th-century American lawyers